2002 Japanese Super Cup was the Japanese Super Cup competition. The match was played at National Stadium in Tokyo on February 23, 2002. Shimizu S-Pulse won the championship.

Match details

References

Japanese Super Cup
2002 in Japanese football
Kashima Antlers matches
Shimizu S-Pulse matches
Japanese Super Cup 2002